The 2010 Maui Invitational Tournament, an annual early-season college basketball tournament held in Lahaina, Hawaii, was won by the Connecticut Huskies.

Bracket

References

Maui Invitational Tournament
Maui Invitational
Maui